The Legislative Assembly of Krasnoyarsk Krai is the regional parliament of Krasnoyarsk Krai, a federal subject of Russia. It consists of 52 deputies elected for five-year terms.

Elections

2021

References

Politics of Krasnoyarsk Krai
Krasnoyarsk Krai